Susanne Riess (born 3 January 1961 in Braunau am Inn) is a former Austrian politician of the Freedom Party of Austria (FPÖ).

Career
In the first government headed by Chancellor Wolfgang Schüssel, which was inaugurated in 2000, she became Vice Chancellor and minister of public services and sports, representing her party in the coalition with Schüssel's Austrian People's Party (ÖVP). The Freedom Party had finished second in the 1999 election, so its leader, Jörg Haider, should have become Chancellor in any coalition with the ÖVP which finished third.  However, Haider yielded to Schüssel in order to appease international opinion.  Although this should have put him in line to become Vice-Chancellor, he realised he was too controversial to have any role in the government. He thus resigned as party leader in favour of Riess-Passer, who had been FPÖ managing chairwoman since 1996.

In the course of the formation of the government in 2000, she became chairwoman and leader of the FPÖ.  She was known for being loyal to Haider, which earned her the nickname Königskobra (King Cobra).

After severe disagreements with her former political mentor Haider in Summer 2002 (the so-called Knittelfeld Putsch), she resigned from all of her posts, as did finance minister Karl-Heinz Grasser and the party spokesman in parliament, Peter Westenthaler.  After the 2002 elections, she remained Vice Chancellor on a provisional basis until the coalition between ÖVP and FPÖ was renewed in early 2003, and has since had no involvement in politics.

Since 2004, Riess-Passer has been the CEO of the Wüstenrot-Gruppe.

Personal life 
In 2022 she married European Commissioner Johannes Hahn.

References

1961 births
Living people
Vice-Chancellors of Austria
People from Braunau am Inn
20th-century Austrian women politicians
20th-century Austrian politicians
21st-century Austrian women politicians
21st-century Austrian politicians